Stock Series is a touring car racing series based in Brazil promoted by Vicar. The series returned in 2018 as Stock Light, having replaced the previous Campeonato Brasileiro de Turismo, Copa Chevrolet Montana formerly known as Stock Car Copa Vicar, Stock Car Light, and Stock Car B which had run since 1993. The series serves as the official access category to Stock Car Brasil, as well as having manufacturer support from Chevrolet. The series champion is awarded a R$ 2.5 million scholarship to compete in Stock Car.

History

In 1993, Stock Car B was created in order to facilitate the access of newcomers to the Stock Car Brasil, until 1999 the category competed in the same grid as Stock Car Brasil.

In 2000 the name of the series was changed to Stock Car Brasil Light and began competing separately from Stock Car Brasil.

In 2010, another change in the access division. The merger between the Copa Vicar and Pick Up Racing resulted in the creation of the Copa Chevrolet Montana, with the engine and the appearance of the pick-ups, inspired by the street version of the Chevrolet Montana. Strong and collecting outstanding teams and drivers in the country, the strong division arrived in search of their place in the national automobile scene.

In 2013 Campeonato Brasileiro de Turismo (Brazilian Touring Championship) replacing Copa Chevrolet Montana. The chassis, designed by JL company is similar that used in Stock Car Brasil with a V8 engine.

In 2022, Stock Light was rebranded to Stock Series and officially designated as the support series to Stock Car Brasil. series promoter Vicar announced that Stock Car, Stock Series, and F4 Brazil would be switching to Hankook tyres from 2023 onwards, replacing Pirelli. On 8 December 2022, Vicar announced that the Stock Series would implement a cost cap of R$ 750 million from 2023 onwards, alongside a R$ 700 million prize pool.

Scoring system

Champions

Stock Car Light/Stock Light

Note – 1993–1999, Stock Car Brasil B. The series competed in same races of Stock Car Brasil.
Note – 2000–2007, Stock Car Light Brasil. Changes the name and become has compete separately from Stock Car Brasil.
Note – 2008–2009,  Copa Vicar. Changed his name due organizers' reasons.
Note – 2018–2021,  Stock Light Brasil.

Copa Chevrolet Montana

Campeonato Brasileiro de Turismo

Fatal accidents

 On 9 December 2007, Rafael Sperafico, of the Sperafico racing family, died during the final race of the Stock Car Light 2007 season at Interlagos. His cousins Rodrigo and Ricardo Sperafico race in the top-level series. It was the first fatal accident in the Stock Car Light series.
 On April 3, 2011, Gustavo Sondermann, competing in a Copa Chevrolet Montana race, was killed at Interlagos in an accident almost identical to that of Sperafico, four years earlier.

See also
Stock Car Brasil

References

External links

 Official website of Stock Series

Stock Car Brasil
Touring car racing series
Auto racing series in Brazil
Recurring sporting events established in 1993
1993 establishments in Brazil
Motorsport competitions in Brazil